Yuanpei University of Medical Technology (YUMT) is a private university in Xiangshan District, Hsinchu City, Taiwan, named after Cai Yuanpei, a renowned educator and philosopher from China.

Yuanpei University of Medical Technology offers undergraduate and graduate programs in various fields of study, including medical technology, nursing, physical therapy, occupational therapy, nutrition, and biomedical informatics.

History
The university was originally established on 8 November 1964 as Yuanpei Institute of Medical Technology after it was founded by Tsai Ping-kung. In 1999, it became Yuanpei University of Science and Technology. It was renamed to Yuanpei University in 2006 and again to Yuanpei University of Medical Technology in 2014.

Faculties
 College of Medical Technology and Nursing
 College of Health Sciences
 College of Wellbeing and Industry

See also
 List of universities in Taiwan

References

External links

 

1964 establishments in Taiwan
Educational institutions established in 1964
Private universities and colleges in Taiwan
Universities and colleges in Hsinchu
Universities and colleges in Taiwan
Technical universities and colleges in Taiwan